Federico Spinola (1571–1603) was an Italian naval commander in Spanish Habsburg service during the Dutch Revolt.

Life
Spinola was born in Genoa in 1571 and studied at the University of Salamanca in preparation for an intended ecclesiastical career. Instead he took service in the Army of Flanders under Alexander Farnese, Duke of Parma.

In 1598 he travelled to Madrid with a proposal to build up a fleet of galleys in Flanders that could be used to launch an invasion of England. Approval was granted, and a squadron of six galleys was placed under his command, which he sailed to Sluis in 1599, establishing his base of operations there.  A further eight galleys sailed from Spain under his command in 1602, to reinforce the squadron at Sluis, but only four of these made it to port. Two were lost en route in the Battle of Sesimbra Bay and two more during the Battle of the Narrow Seas (1602). On 26 May the following year Spinola died in the Battle of Sluis (1603), bringing to an end his experiment in adopting Mediterranean naval warfare to northern waters.

A portrait of him was painted by Federico Barocci in 1595, and a poem by Francisco de Quevedo memorializes his exploits.

References

1571 births
1603 deaths
University of Salamanca alumni
Genoese admirals
Italian people of the Eighty Years' War